Big Pine Creek may refer to:

 Big Pine Creek (California), Inyo County, California
 Big Pine Creek (Indiana), west-central Indiana
 Big Pine Creek (Texas)